Ekrem is a Turkish form of the Arabic given name Akram, meaning "kind," "generous," or "benevolent." Sometimes rendered Eqrem in Albania. Notable people with these names include:

Ekrem 
 Ekrem Akurgal (1911–2002), Turkish archaeologist
 Ekrem Alican (1916–2000), Turkish politician
 Ekrem Bardha (born 1933), Albanian-American businessman
 Ekrem Bora (1934–2012), Turkish film actor
 Ekrem Boyalı (born 1970), Turkish taekwondo practitioner and coach
 Ekrem Bradarić (born 1969), Bosnian footballer
 Ekrem Celil (born 1980), Turkish weightlifter
 Ekrem Dağ (born 1980), Austrian footballer of Turkish descent
 Ekrem Ekşioğlu (born 1978), Turkish footballer
 Ekrem Ekinci, Turkish chemist
 Ekrem Ibrić (born 1962), Yugoslav football player
 Ekrem İmamoğlu (born 1970), Turkish politician and current Mayor of Istanbul
 Ekrem Jevrić, Montenegrin singer and musician
 Ekrem Kahya (born 1978), Turkish-Dutch footballer
 Ekrem Koçak (1931–1993), Turkish middle distance runner
 Ekrem Libohova, Albanian politician
 György Ekrem-Kemál (1946–2009), Hungarian nationalist political figure
 Hamid Ekrem Šahinović (1882–1936), Bosniak writer and dramatist
 Reşat Ekrem Koçu (1905–1975), Turkish writer and historian

Eqrem 
 Eqrem Basha, Kosovan writer
 Eqrem Çabej, Albanian scholar
 Eqrem Vlora, Albanian politician

See also
 Akram
 Ekram (disambiguation)

Turkish masculine given names
Bosniak masculine given names